Antoni Aleksander Iliński, also known as Iskender Pasha (1812–1861), was a Polish-Ottoman military officer and general. A Polish independence activist and insurgent, he took part in the independence struggles of Poles and Hungarians against the Austrian-Russian alliance. He converted to Islam in 1844 and subsequently served in various commanding posts in the Ottoman Army during the reign of Abdulmejid I (1839–1861) in Bosnia and Herzegovina, Danube, Crimea, Transcaucasia, and Baghdad. He was promoted to the rank of Pasha (General) during the Crimean War in 1855.

Early life and conversion to Islam
Antoni Aleksander Iliński was born in 1812 to a Polish noble family in the town of Yarmolyntsi in Ukraine. In 1830, he took part in the November Uprising as a young officer of the Lithuanian Legion. He was an active member of the movement of Polish exiles led by Prince Adam Jerzy Czartoryski from Paris. Iliński worked under the leadership of Józef Bem in his abortive Portuguese Legion attempt (1833), and in further struggles to form Polish legions in Spain, France and elsewhere.

In 1844 he was arrested in Istanbul upon Russian request, for allegedly working to organise Ukrainian Cossack legions under Michał Czajkowski's "Eastern Agency". The Ottoman authorities were indifferent, but Russia pressured for his handover for trial. To escape this trap, he consented to an offer to convert to Islam and assumed Ottoman nationality under the new name of Mehmed Iskender. He was immediately accepted as a lieutenant colonel in the Ottoman Army as "Iskender Beg". In the years 1848–49, during the time of Spring of Nations, he was again Bem's aide in Hungary.

In the Ottoman Army 
He served in the Army of Roumelia under Omar Pasha. He was a prominent figure in the military campaign that deposed and eventually executed the Herzegovina Vizier Ali-paša Rizvanbegović in 1851.

When the Crimean War broke out in 1853, he was charged with organizing and training the irregular troops (the bashi-bazouks) along the Danube. In the following year, Iskender Pasha's fierce and daring style in commanding successful cavalry raids on Russians brought him acclaim and he was soon promoted as colonel.

Early 1855 he was posted in the Yevpatoria Garrison in Crimea commanding a 400-strong cavalry regiment. His unit made a critical contribution in successfully repulsing a strong Russian assault on the town, which was threatening the rear of the Allied army besieging Sebastopol (see:Battle of Eupatoria) This victory brought him a second promotion in a year, making him a Pasha (general), (specifically a Mirliva, equivalent of a brigadier general).

The same year he commanded the advance guard of an expedition army under Omar Pasha which landed at Sukhumi, in the hope of relieving the Eastern Anatolian fortress-city Kars from a Russian siege (see: Siege of Kars). The city fell to the Russians, however, before the two armies could engage.

In 1857 he was again called to duty by Omar Pasha, who was appointed as the Governor and General Commander of Baghdad. He went to Baghdad and was active in the repression of tribal uprisings around Basra and in the Nejd area.

On his return to Constantinople in 1861, he fell suddenly ill after an official banquet and died on 2 June 1861. He was buried in Edirnekapı Martyr's Cemetery in Constantinople.

References
In English:
 Barham, John: "Bono, Johnny Turk!" article in "suite101"
 Blake, R. L. V. Ffrench: The Crimean War, Sphere Books Ltd., London, 1971. p. 137.
 The Times: various issues between 1851–1856 (nos. 20745, 20774, 20780, 21530, 21757, 21816, 21822, 22223, 22260, 22263, 22284, 22299, 22498, keyword "Skender Beg")

In Turkish:
 Eren-Griffe, Mirgül: Osmanlı’nın Hizmetkarı, Babil Yayıncılık, İstanbul 2005, ss.125–129.
 Drozdz, Jerzy : (article originally posted and then removed from Polish Embassy (Ankara) website, cited in:) http://maviboncuk.blogspot.com/2004/06/xix-yzyl-osmanl-ordusunda-polonyallar.html
 Hidayet Bey (Iskender Pasha's Grandson): Unpublished personal notes.

In Polish:
 Latka, Jerzy: Adampol, Polska Wies Nad Bosforem, Kraków, 1981.
 Latka, Jerzy: Lew Nasz, Lew Polski: Pasza Iskender (Antoni Ilinski), Kraków-Gdansk, 1996.

Diplomats of the Hôtel Lambert
1814 births
1861 deaths
Activists of the Great Emigration
Ottoman Army generals
Pashas
November Uprising participants
Polish people of the Crimean War (Turkish side)
Ottoman military personnel of the Crimean War
Converts to Islam
Polish Muslims
Polish generals in other armies
Polish emigrants to the Ottoman Empire